Hoodoo Man Blues is the debut album of blues vocalist and harmonica player Junior Wells, performing with the Junior Wells' Chicago Blues Band, an early collaboration with guitarist Buddy Guy. Released on LP by Delmark Records in November 1965, the album has been subsequently reissued on CD and LP by Delmark and Analogue Productions.

The album of Chicago blues music was solicited by Bob Koester, the founder of Delmark Records, who liked Wells' music enough to give the musician considerable freedom on the album despite concerns of commercial response. The resultant innovative album became Delmark's best-seller, establishing Wells' career and receiving critical acclaim as being among the best albums Wells ever produced and among the greatest blues albums ever made.

Background

Record producer Bob Koester, the founder of Delmark Records who is credited with discovering Wells along with producer Sam Charters, recalls that at the time he was considering releasing an album by Wells, he was anxious about both the audience for Wells' music and the expense of studio time and sidemen, but that he liked the music too much to resist. Wells was given the liberty to select his own sidemen and tracklist, without the usual limitation of songs two or three minutes long, and the album that resulted became Delmark's then best-seller, a distinction that had not been surpassed as of 2003.

Koester remembers particular complications working with Guy, who was incorrectly believed to be legally entailed with Leonard Chess of Chess Records. Chess approved Guy's participation on the album, but refused to allow Guy's name to be listed in the credits until it was realized that his participation was not contractually disallowed. Guy was, at the time of release, credited as "Friendly Chap", a name proposed by Peter Brown, who later founded Down with the Game Records in the UK, with the explanation that "A buddy is a friend, a guy is a chap". For parts of the session, Guy's guitar amplifier was not working, and his guitar was wired instead through the Leslie speaker of the studio's Hammond organ. Koester said, "I've always been amazed at how rarely reviewers commented on the guitar-organ tracks".

Koester also recalls that 15 minutes of "releasable music", including a duet between Guy and Wells, was lost, with the tapes probably having been used later to record a rehearsal.

Wells related to The Chicago Tribune in 1993 that the song from which the title of the album was drawn almost didn't make the album. He had recorded "Hoodoo Man Blues" on a 78 rpm record years before, but when the song was presented to radio personnel for possible rotation they had rejected it violently, throwing it on the floor and stomping on it. Wells, too disappointed to want to try again, credits Koester's encouragement with the song's presence on the album.

Reception

The album, characterized by Little Labels—Big Sound as "blatantly non-commercial", demonstrated to audiences that Chicago Blues could be effectively captured on album. "[O]ne of the first to fully document the smoky ambience of a night at a West side nightspot in the superior acoustics of a recording studio", according to Bill Dahl of Allmusic, it popularized Wells, opening doors for him at other, larger studios. But though it was only the first of many successful albums for Wells, it remains among his most acclaimed. Rolling Stone, in a 1970 review of Wells' later album South Side Blues Jam, declared it "a classic, some of the best blues Chicago has to offer". In 1998, The New York Times described it as among the artist's best recorded works. In 2008, The Times declared it to be Wells' "most celebrated album". In their 2005 biography of Howlin' Wolf, James Segrest and Mark Hoffman make note that it is one of the albums usually cited by critics as "one of the greatest blues albums ever released."

Track listing
Titles, songwriting credits, and running times are taken from the original Delmark LP record album liner notes and record label.  Other sources may show different listings.

Original album

Personnel
Stu Black – engineer
Buddy Guy (originally billed as Friendly Chap) – guitar, vocals
Zbigniew Jastrzebski – cover design
Bob Koester – producer, liner notes, supervisor
Jack Myers – bass
Greg Roberts ( Bob Koester) – photography
Roger Seibel – digital mastering
Bill Warren – drums
Junior Wells – harmonica, vocals

Footnotes

References 

Junior Wells albums
1965 debut albums
Buddy Guy albums
Delmark Records albums
Albums produced by Bob Koester
United States National Recording Registry recordings
United States National Recording Registry albums